Bellen is a Germanic surname that may refer to
Aleksander von der Bellen (1859–1924), Russian politician and nobleman
Alexander Van der Bellen (born 1944), Austrian politician and economist, grandson of Aleksander
Ian Van Bellen (born 1945), British rugby league footballer 
Gary Van Bellen (born 1957), British rugby league footballer, brother of Ian
Hugo J. Bellen (born 1953), American geneticist
Joost van Bellen (born 1962), Dutch electro DJ and event organizer
Martine Bellen, American poet, editor and librettist